David Feintuch (July 21, 1944 – March 16, 2006) was a science fiction and fantasy author and attorney.

Life and career
Feintuch was the 1996 winner of the John W. Campbell Award for Best New Writer in Science Fiction. He wrote one major science fiction series, the Seafort Saga, and a fantasy series, Rodrigo of Caledon. Feintuch's literary works have been recognized and highlighted at Michigan State University in their Michigan Writers Series.

The Seafort Saga is a military space opera series revolving around the character Nicholas Seafort, an officer in the UNNS. The books are set in a future human society that is largely dominated by unified Christianity.  The main protagonist is a naval officer who strives always to do his duty, both to the navy and to his God, at great personal cost.  The series and main character are inspired by C. S. Forester's novels about Horatio Hornblower. Shortly before his death, the author announced on his website that an eighth book, Galahad's Hope, had been completed and was in the publication stage; its current status is unknown. Books in the Seafort Saga have been translated into Russian, German, Japanese, Spanish and Czech (published by  Talpress).

Published works

Seafort Saga
Midshipman's Hope (1994)
Challenger's Hope (1995)
Prisoner's Hope (1995)
Fisherman's Hope (1996)
Voices of Hope (1996)
Patriarch's Hope (1999)
Children of Hope (2001)

Rodrigo of Caledon
The Still (1997)  (Time Warner trade paperback)  (1998 Aspect paperback)  (Orbit paperback)
The King (2002)  (Ace hardcover)  (2003 Ace paperback)

References

External links

Obituary at The Independent 

1944 births
2006 deaths
20th-century American novelists
21st-century American novelists
American male novelists
American science fiction writers
John W. Campbell Award for Best New Writer winners
20th-century American male writers
21st-century American male writers